Brighton, Nova Scotia could be one of following two communities:

Brighton, Shelburne, Nova Scotia near the town of Lockeport in Shelburne County
Brighton, Digby, Nova Scotia  in Digby County